Sonia is the second album by British pop star Sonia, released in October 1991 on IQ Records, after parting company with Chrysalis Records and Stock Aitken Waterman. Sonia's second album was produced by Nigel Wright and for the first time Sonia co-wrote some of the songs.

The album features the singles "Only Fools (Never Fall in Love)", "Be Young, Be Foolish, Be Happy" and "You to Me Are Everything", all of which were hits in the UK Singles Chart, while the album itself reached No.33.

The album was repackaged and released as a debut album in the US in 1992, while the album was further repackaged and released in Japan, though both versions met with little success. Following this, Sonia was moved to BMG Eurodisc's Arista Records imprint and agreed to take part in the Eurovision Song Contest in 1993.

Track listing 
 "Only Fools (Never Fall in Love)" (Tony Hiller, Barry Upton) 3:45 
 "You to Me Are Everything" (Denne, Gold) 3:55
 "Breakdown" (Johnson, Pendse) 3:44
 "I'm Not Gonna Play Around No More" (Sonia Evans, Stock) 4:39
 "Walk Away Lover" (Crosbie, Yoyo) 3:46
 "That Boy" (Stock) 4:08
 "Be Young, Be Foolish, Be Happy" (J. R. Cobb, Ray Whitley) 2:56
 "Be My Baby" (Stock) 3:54
 "Used to Be My Love" (Evans, Stock) 3:45 
 "Say Goodbye to Me" (Evans, Robertson) 3:47
 "Strong Without You" (Stock) 4:02

Japanese Bonus Tracks
 "You to Me Are Everything" (12 Inch Version) 6:04
 "Only Fools (Never Fall in Love)" (Extended Club Mix) 6:23

Personnel
Michael Brauer - remixing
Al Cobb - composer
Simon Cowe - producer
Simon Cowell - executive producer
Paul Cox - photography
Michael Denne - composer
Ken Gold - composer
Peter Hammond - mixing
Kelly Johnson - composer
Jacqueline Murphy - art direction, design
Adam Pendse - composer
Robin Sellars - engineer
Sonia - primary artist, guitar, vocals
Ray Whitley - composer
Nigel Wright - producer

References 

1991 albums
Sonia (singer) albums